Black Mountain is a summit and the high point of Anticline Ridge in the Diablo Range of Fresno County, California.

References

Mountains of Fresno County, California
Diablo Range